A Dozen Roses – Greatest Hits is the first compilation album by American country rock group The Desert Rose Band. It was released January 4, 1991, via MCA/Curb. The album peaked at number 44 on the Top Country Albums chart.

Critical reception
A review of the album in Billboard was positive, calling the album a "bright bouquet".

Track listing
Source: Allmusic

Reception

The Allmusic review by William Ruhlmann awarded the album 4.5 stars stating

Personnel 
Bill Brunt – art direction, design
Bill Bryson – bass guitar
Annette Cisneros, Dave Glover, Brad Jones, Pete Magdaleno, Ken Paulakovich, Mike Poole, Russ Ragsdale, Clarke Schleicher – assistant engineer
Steve Duncan – drums, percussion
Greg Gorman – photography
Chris Hillman – acoustic guitar, vocals
John Jorgenson – arranger, acoustic guitar, electric guitar, mandolin, mixing, vocals
Jim Kemp – art direction
JayDee Maness – pedal steel
Glenn Meadows – mastering
Robert K. Oermann – liner notes
Herb Pedersen – acoustic guitar, vocals, lead vocals on "Hello Trouble"
Ed Seay – mixing, producer (except for tracks 1-3)
Paul Worley – producer

Chart performance

References

1991 greatest hits albums
The Desert Rose Band albums
MCA Records compilation albums
Curb Records compilation albums
Albums produced by Paul Worley